Yosef Sprinzak (8 December 1885 – 28 January 1959) was a leading Zionist activist in the first half of the 20th century, an Israeli politician, and the first Speaker of the Knesset, a role he held from 1949 until his death in 1959.

Biography
Yosef Sprinzak was born in Moscow, Russia but following the expulsion of Jews in 1891 moved with his family to Kishinev where he was a founder of the Tze'irei Zion (Zion Youth). He began medical school at the American University in Beirut in 1908 and settled in Palestine in 1910, during the Second Aliyah (1904–1914).

Along with Eliezer Kaplan Sprinzak headed Hapoel Hatzair ("The Young Worker") a Zionist socialist faction formed in 1905 and one of the organisations that consolidated to form Mapai in 1930. Its members were pro-British and supported Chaim Weizmann. He was a founder of the Histadrut in 1920 and acted as secretary general of the organisation from 1945 to 1949.

His son Yair Sprinzak also served in the Knesset. Another son, Aharon David Sprinzak, an Israeli Air Force pilot, was killed in action during the 1948 Arab-Israeli War. His grandson, Ehud Sprinzak (1940-2002) was one of Israel's foremost experts on counterterrorism and far-right Jewish groups.

Political career
Sprinzak was elected to the position of speaker of the provisional parliament on 15 July 1948, a role in which he helped lay the foundations of Israel's parliamentarism. He was elected to the first Knesset in 1949 as a member of Mapai, and became the Speaker of the new body. He was re-elected and remained speaker in both the second and third Knessets.

As part of his role as speaker, Sprinzak became acting President of Israel when Chaim Weizmann fell ill from 12 December 1951. After Weizmann's death on 9 November 1952 Sprinzak served as interim President until inauguration of Yitzhak Ben-Zvi on 10 December 1952.

Gallery

References

Bibliography
 Goldberg, Giora (2003). Ben-Gurion Against the Knesset. London: Routledge. 
 Sofer, Sasson (1998). Zionism and the Foundations of Israeli Diplomacy. Cambridge: Cambridge University Press.

External links

Jewish Virtual Library

|-

|-

1885 births
1959 deaths
Politicians from Moscow
Russian Jews
Zionist activists
Jewish socialists
Jews in Ottoman Palestine
General Secretaries of Histadrut
Leaders of political parties in Israel
Moldovan emigrants to Israel
Emigrants from the Russian Empire to the Ottoman Empire
Mapai politicians
Jews in Mandatory Palestine
Burials at Mount Herzl
Members of the Assembly of Representatives (Mandatory Palestine)
Members of the 1st Knesset (1949–1951)
Members of the 2nd Knesset (1951–1955)
Members of the 3rd Knesset (1955–1959)
Speakers of the Knesset